Ekaloveyudu is a 2008 Indian Telugu-language romantic film directed by debutant KRK. The film stars Uday Kiran, Krithi Ahuja, and Bob Antony in the lead roles.

Plot 
Karthik is saved by a train by Bhakta, a don, who gives Kathik an enormous amount of money. Karthik goes to Ooty and meets Indu. After Indu leaves Ooty and Karthik goes searching for her, Bhakta goes hunting for both of them.

Cast 

Uday Kiran as Karthik
Krithi Ahuja as Indu
Babu Antony as Bhakta (credited as Bob Antony)
Chitram Seenu
Abhishek
Vinayak
Vijay Sai
Dharmavarapu Subrahmanyam
Ahuti Prasad
Sudha
Chalapathi Rao 
Narsing Yadav
Master Bharath

Production  
The film's title was announced as Ekaloveyudu and was to be directed by a debutant. The title was created by writer Sai. Regarding the title, one of the producers,  Amarchand Medikonda, state that  "There is a sentiment behind the title of the film. Our blockbusters Suryudu and Narasimha Naidu ended with the same last two letters. In an interview with Idlebrain, Uday Kiran justified the title by stating that, "In Mahabharath, the character of Ekalavya is known for his devotion towards his guru. He kept his word for the guru. He cut his thumb and presented it as dhanam. Here, the hero too holds his promise". The film was shot in 75 days.

Soundtrack 
The audio was launched on 21 September with KS Rama Rao, B. Gopal, Sekhar Suri, Ravi Raja Pinisetty, C. Kalyan, Devi Vara Prasad, and Medikonda Murali Krishna attending the event. The soundtrack was composed by Anil Krishna.
"Happyga Unta" - Chinmayi

Release 
The film was scheduled to release in the second half of April. A critic from Full Hyderabad gave the film a rating of three and a half out of five and wrote that "EkaLoveYudu is just for Uday Kiran fans, and those desperate for any romance".

References

External links

2008 films
2000s Telugu-language films
2008 romantic drama films
Indian romantic drama films